The Diocese of Corumbá is a Latin Church ecclesiastical territory or diocese of the Catholic Church located in the city of Corumbá, Brazil. It is a suffragan in the ecclesiastical province of the metropolitan Archdiocese Campo Grande.

History
 March 10, 1910: Established as the Diocese of Corumbá with territory from the Diocese of Cuiabá

Bishops
 Bishops of Corumbá, in reverse chronological order
 Bishop João Aparecido Bergamasco, S.A.C. (2018.12.19 - present)
 Bishop Segismundo Martínez Álvarez, S.D.B. (2004.12.07 – 2018.12.19)
 Bishop Mílton Antônio dos Santos, S.D.B. (2000.05.31 – 2003.06.04), appointed Coadjutor Archbishop of Cuiabá, Mato Grosso
 Bishop José Alves da Costa D.C. (1991.05.08 – 1999.07.21)
 Bishop Pedro Fré, C.Ss.R. (1985.10.28 – 1989.12.02), appointed Bishop of Barretos, São Paulo
 Bishop Vitório Pavanello, S.D.B. (1981.11.26 – 1984.11.26), appointed Coadjutor Archbishop of Campo Grande, Mato Grosso do Sul
 Bishop Onofre Cândido Rosa, S.D.B. (1978.07.05 – 1981.02.16), appointed Bishop of Jardim, Mato Grosso do Sul
 Bishop Ladislau Paz, S.D.B. (1957.11.28 – 1978.07.05)
 Bishop Orlando Chaves, S.D.B. (1948.02.29 – 1956.12.18), appointed Archbishop of Cuiabá, Mato Grosso
 Bishop Vicente Maria Bartholomeu Priante, S.D.B. (1933.05.13 – 1944.12.04)
 Bishop Antônio de Almeida Lustosa, S.D.B. (1928.12.17 – 1931.07.10), appointed Archbishop of Fortaleza, Ceara
 Bishop José Maurício da Rocha (1919.03.10 – 1927.02.04), appointed Bishop of Bragança Paulista, São Paulo
 Bishop Helvécio Gomes de Oliveira, S.D.B. (1918.02.15 – 1918.06.18), appointed Bishop of São Luís do Maranhão; future Archbishop
 Bishop Cyrillo de Paula Freitas (1911.03.13 – 1918.02.08)

Coadjutor bishop
Onofre Cândido Rosa, S.D.B. (1977-1978)

Auxiliary bishop
Ladislau Paz, S.D.B. (1955-1957), appointed Bishop here

References
 GCatholic.org
 Catholic Hierarchy

Roman Catholic dioceses in Brazil
Christian organizations established in 1910
Corumbá, Roman Catholic Diocese of
Roman Catholic dioceses and prelatures established in the 20th century
1910 establishments in Brazil